Tetragonitidae is a family of Cretaceous lytoceratin ammonites typically with square or trapezoidal whorl section at least during some growth stage.  Members of this family are usually smooth but some lirate or striate, often with constrictions. Other features include suture with a varying number of auxiliary saddles, and an internal suture with two or more.  Major saddles are irregularly trifid.  The family is derived from the genus Tetragonites.

Taxonomy
Presently the Tetragonitidae are divided into two subfamilies:
subfam. Gabbioceratinae
 Gabbioceras
 Jauberticeras
subfam. Tetragonitinae
 Parajaubertella
 Takahashia 
 Tetragonites

The Tetragonitidae have also been known as the Tetragonitinae, a subfamily of the Tetrogonitidae (sensu Arkell et al., 1957) which also included the Gaudryderatinae, which has since been elevated to the full family Gaudriceratidae.

References
 Arkell et al., 1957. Mesozoic Ammonoidea. Treatise on Invertebrate Paleontology, Part L. Geological Society of America. R.C. Moore, ed. 
Paleobiology Database-Tetragonitidae

Ammonitida families
Lytoceratina
Aptian first appearances
Maastrichtian extinctions